Pepper Adams Plays the Compositions of Charlie Mingus, is an album by baritone saxophonist Pepper Adams featuring Quintet and Octet performances of Charles Mingus' compositions which was recorded in 1963 and originally released on the Motown subsidiary label, Workshop Jazz.

Reception 

The Penguin Guide to Jazz states "Adams led this date with his usual no-nonsense authority ... A solid jazz record".

The Allmusic review by Thom Jurek states "This is one of those must-own recordings for fans of Adams; but it is also for those who revere Mingus' work, because, as radical as some of these interpretations are, they were not only sanctioned by, but delighted in by the composer".

Track listing 
All compositions by Charles Mingus.
 "Fables of Faubus" – 4:30
 "Black Light" – 3:45
 "Song with Orange" – 2:35
 "Carolyn" – 5:10
 "Better Git It in Your Soul" – 4:05
 "Incarnation" – 5:45
 "Portrait" – 2:55
 "Haitian Fight Song" – 7:55
 "Strollin' Honies" – 5:50

Personnel 
Pepper Adams – baritone saxophone
Thad Jones – trumpet
Benny Powell – trombone (tracks 5, 7 & 8)
Charles McPherson – alto saxophone (tracks 5, 7 & 8)
Zoot Sims – tenor saxophone (tracks 5, 7 & 8)
Hank Jones – piano
Paul Chambers (tracks 1–4, 6 & 9), Bob Cranshaw (tracks 5, 7 & 8) – bass
Dannie Richmond – drums

References 

Pepper Adams albums
1964 albums
Workshop Jazz Records albums
Charles Mingus tribute albums